Anonymous peer review may refer to:
An anonymous scholarly peer review (as opposed to an open one)
Any form of peer review that has some form of anonymity